Midsummer is a celebration to mark the time around the summer solstice.

Midsummer may also refer to:

Festivals
 Chester Midsummer Watch Parade, UK
 Duanwu Festival, the Mid-Summer Festival on the 5th day of the 5th month in the Chinese lunisolar calendar
 NYC Midsummer, Swedish midsummer celebration in New York, USA

Other uses
 Midsummer Common, area of common land in central Cambridge, UK
 Midsummer House, restaurant in Cambridge, UK

See also
 A Midsummer Night's Dream (disambiguation)
 Central European Midsummer Time
 Midsommar, a 2019 folk horror film
 Midsommer, a 2003 psychological horror film
 Midsumma Festival, an annual festival held in Melbourne, Australia
 Midwinter (disambiguation)
 Solstice
 Summer solstice (disambiguation)